"Jaded" is a song by British electronic music duo Disclosure. It was released worldwide on 1 August 2015 from the duo's second studio album, Caracal. The track was written by Howard Lawrence, Guy Lawrence, Sam Romans and Jimmy Napes. The track peaked at number 87 in the UK Singles Chart. It features vocals from Howard rather than a guest vocalist.

Track listing
Digital download
"Jaded" – 4:35

Digital download – The Remixes
"Jaded" (Lone remix) – 5:07
"Jaded" (Hermitude remix) – 3:47
"Jaded" (Dense & Pika remix) – 6:31
"Jaded" (Jammer remix) – 3:45
"Jaded" (Kerri Chandler Kaoz 623 dub) – 6:25

Charts

Release history

See also
 List of number-one dance singles of 2015 (U.S.)

References

Disclosure (band) songs
2015 singles
2015 songs
Island Records singles
Songs written by Romans (musician)
Songs written by Jimmy Napes
Songs written by Guy Lawrence
Songs written by Howard Lawrence